Eleftherios Thanopoulos (born 22 February 1975) is a Greek racewalker. He competed in the men's 20 kilometres walk at the 2004 Summer Olympics.

References

1975 births
Living people
Athletes (track and field) at the 2004 Summer Olympics
Greek male racewalkers
Olympic athletes of Greece
Place of birth missing (living people)